The Thomas's langur (Presbytis thomasi) is a species of primate in the family Cercopithecidae. It is endemic to northern Sumatra, Indonesia. Its natural habitat is subtropical or tropical dry forests. It is threatened by habitat loss. Its native names are reungkah in Acehnese and kedih in Alas.

References

Thomas's langur
Endemic fauna of Sumatra
Primates of Indonesia
Vulnerable fauna of Asia
Thomas's langur
Taxonomy articles created by Polbot
Taxa named by Robert Collett